Peggy Cartwright (November 14, 1912 – June 12, 2001) was a Canadian silent film actress and the leading lady of the Our Gang comedy series during the silent film era. She appeared in four short films released in 1922 (and, possibly, the initial entry of the series, Our Gang). Cartwright is confirmed as having starred in these first four Our Gang shorts: One Terrible Day premiered on September 10, 1922; Fire Fighters premiered on October 8, 1922; Young Sherlocks premiered on November 26, 1922; and Saturday Morning premiered on December 3, 1922.

Early life and career
Peggy Cartwright was a child actress born on November 14, 1912 in Vancouver, British Columbia. She appeared in several of the early Our Gang short films from the silent film era; although her appearances would solely be those released in 1922.

As Cartwright's career was beginning to advance, her father—a doctor—insisted that his family return to Canada in order that his children receive decent scholarships. Subsequently, Cartwright continued her studies in Vancouver. She later became proficient in Russian ballet.

In 1927, Cartwright traveled with her mother to London, where she entered Rada. Two years later, she worked on the London stage at the St. Martin's Theater.

In 1931, she briefly returned to filming, firstly with a minor role in Victor Saville's The Faithful Heart (which would be released in 1932). She also performed alongside Jack Buchanan and Anna Neagle as Greta in the musical film Goodnight, Vienna. The same year, Cartwright performed in the British drama film Hindle Wakes, which would prove to be the final film in which she would perform. Shortly thereafter, Cartwright relocated to New York.

The same year Cartwright relocated to America, she married comedian Phil Baker, with whom she subsequently had nine children. She would later divorce Baker in 1941, and later married actor William "Bill" Walker in 1962.

Later years
When her children reached adulthood, Cartwright obtained a job as a secretary in Los Angeles. Here, she became acquainted with William Walker, whom she later married. They remained married until his death in 1992.

Cartwright made an appearance at the 12th International Sons of the Desert Convention in 2000. This was her first and only appearance at the convention, and she happily discussed her brief tenure in the Our Gang series. She was the last surviving member of the original Our Gang group of children.

Death
Cartwright died shortly thereafter, in 2001. She and Walker, a United States Army World War I veteran, are buried at Riverside National Cemetery in Riverside, California.

Filmography
 The Birth of a Nation (1915) - Young Girl in Cabin (uncredited)
 Intolerance (1916) - Little Girl (uncredited)
 A Kentucky Cinderella (1917)
 The Poor Boob (1919) - Little Girl (uncredited)
 From Hand to Mouth (1919, Short) - The Waif
 The Third Generation (1920) - Nancy Jane
 Love (1920) - Beatrice Storm
 Penrod (1922) - (uncredited)
 Afraid to Fight (1922) - Sally Harper
 Robin Hood, Jr. (1923) - The Girl, later Maid Marian
 A Lady of Quality (1924) - Clorinda (age 6)
 The Iron Horse (1924) - Miriam as a Girl (uncredited)
 Hindle Wakes (1931) - (uncredited)
 Goodnight, Vienna (1932) - Greta
 The Faithful Heart (1932) - (final film role)

Our Gang
 One Terrible Day (1922, Short) - Girl At Estate
 Fire Fighters (1922, Short) - Peggy
 Young Sherlocks (1922, Short) - Mary Jane
 A Quiet Street (1922, Short) - Banty's Sister (uncredited)

Further reading

References

External links

 
 
 http://theluckycorner.com/rps/001.html
 Peggy Cartwright in 2000

1912 births
2001 deaths
20th-century Canadian actresses
Actresses from Vancouver
Burials at Riverside National Cemetery
Canadian child actresses
Canadian film actresses
Canadian silent film actresses
Our Gang